Bintree is a village and civil parish in Norfolk, England, about nine miles (14 km) south-east of Fakenham.  According to the 2001 census it had a population of 300, increasing to 329 at the 2011 Census. For the purposes of local government it falls within the Upper Wensum Ward of Breckland District Council and the Elmham and Mattishall Division of Norfolk County Council.

The villages name means 'Bynna's tree'.

Notable landmarks in the village include the village sign, a traditional red phone box and the now-disused Bintry Mill.

Richard Enraght, former Rector of St Swithun Church, Bintree 

Richard Enraght (1837–1898) was an Irish-born Church of England priest of the late nineteenth century. He was appointed Vicar of St Swithun's Bintree with Themelthorpe in 1895, after being presented to the benefice by Charles Rawdon-Hastings, Earl of Loudoun and Lord Hastings.

Enraght's belief in the Church of England's Catholic tradition, his promotion of ritualism in worship, and his writings on Catholic Worship and Church-State relationships, led him into conflict with the Public Worship Regulation Act of 1874. While serving as Vicar of Holy Trinity, Bordesley, Birmingham, he paid the ultimate price under the act of prosecution and imprisonment in Warwick prison in 1880–1881.

Enraght died on St Matthew's Day, September 21, 1898 and is buried at the south-east end of St Swithun's churchyard, Bintree. His grave is that of a “Confessor” (someone who suffered for the faith, while not dying for it). Two windows of the Lady Chapel, depicting the Annunciation of Our Lady are dedicated to Enraght as well as a statue of St Swithun above the porch, inscribed: “It is placed as a memorial to a great and good priest, Richard William Enraght”.

Notable people

John Astley, Rector 1759–1771

War Memorial
St. Swithun's Churchyard holds a stone plaque dedicated to the memory of the men from Bintree who fell in the world wars. The following names are listed for the First World War:
 Private Ernest G. Vince (d.1917), Machine Gun Corps
 Private George Spooner (1895-1915), 5th Battalion, Royal Norfolk Regiment
 Private Bertie G. Wakefield (1893-1916), 9th Battalion, Royal Norfolk Regiment
 Private W. George Watson (1899-1918), 7th Battalion, Northamptonshire Regiment

And, the following for the Second World War:
 Sapper Sidney J. Stearman (1922-1944), 1021 Port Operating Company, Royal Engineers

References

http://kepn.nottingham.ac.uk/map/place/Norfolk/Bintree

External links

Villages in Norfolk
Civil parishes in Norfolk
Breckland District